Cân i Gymru 2009 was the fortieth edition of S4C's Cân i Gymru, an annual Welsh singing contest. The 2009 edition was held in Venue Cymru, Llandudno. It was presented by Sarra Elgan and Rhydian Bowen Phillips. On the jury there were 6 judges. The winner was teacher Elfed Morgan with the song Gofiadau.

Participants

References 

2009 in Wales
S4C original programming
2009
2009 song contests